Samuel S. Carr (1837–1908) was an American pastoral and landscape painter. Originally from England, where he trained at the Royal School of Design in Chester, he relocated to the U.S. (specifically, New York City, where he later studied mechanical drawing in 1865) around 1862. He is recorded as having lived in Brooklyn from 1879 to 1907, during which he developed an eerie style of painting in which shapes would be repeated, flipped, and rotated over and over, while still remaining lifelike.  He lived in Brooklyn along with his sister, Annie, and her husband, John Bond. He never married.
He often signed his pieces "S.S. Carr". Some of his paintings have sold at auction for more than US$70,000.

References

American landscape painters
1837 births
1908 deaths
People from Brooklyn
English emigrants to the United States
Painters from New York City
19th-century American painters
American male painters
19th-century American male artists